The Eldorado broad-nosed bat (Platyrrhinus aurarius) is a species of bat in the family Phyllostomidae. It is found in Guyana, Suriname, northern Brazil, and southern Venezuela.

Sources

Platyrrhinus
Mammals described in 1972
Taxonomy articles created by Polbot
Bats of South America